Timothy Sean Ormsby (born June 17, 1959) is an American politician. He is a Democratic member of the Washington House of Representatives, and represents Washington's third district since 2003.

Ormsby went to North Central High School in Spokane, Washington. His brother, Michael C. Ormsby, was the US Attorney for the Eastern District of Washington.

In 2018, Ormsby was charged with a DUI after rolling his Jeep, however that charge was dropped in exchange for his guilty plea to reckless driving. The next year he blocked a bill that would have made receiving four (4) DUIs in a fifteen (15) year period a felony offense.

Awards and honors

Ormsby was one of four recipients of the 2009 Fuse "Sizzle" Awards Mother Jones Award. The award honored the lawmakers for their leadership of a coalition of conservation and labor legislators.

References

External links 
 Timm Ormsby at ballotpedia.org

Living people
Democratic Party members of the Washington House of Representatives
1959 births
21st-century American politicians